The Dubai Tram is a tramway located in Al Sufouh, Dubai, United Arab Emirates. It runs for  along Al Sufouh Road from Dubai Marina to the Palm Jumeirah and Al Sufouh. The tram connects with the DMCC and Sobha Realty stations of the Dubai Metro's Red Line, and two more stations are expected to connect with the tram in the future. The Dubai Tram is also connected with the monorail of the Palm Jumeirah at the entrance of the Palm from Sufouh Road.

The Dubai Tram is the fourth tramway project in the world after the Bordeaux tramway in 2003, and the Reims and Angers tramways in 2011, to be powered by the Alstom APS ground-based electric supply system.

Construction
The planning and construction of the Dubai Tram was undertaken by a consortium of Alstom, Besix and Parsons.

Construction has been divided into two phases: Phase 1, was expected to be open in April 2011, however it was delayed until November 2014. Upon completion, Phase 1 of the tramline will operate 11 trams, serving 11 stations, covering  of route. The Phase 1 will cost AED 3.18 Billion. Some  of the Dubai Tram project will be built as part of the first Phase 1. Phase 2 will add 14 more trams and eight more stations along an additional  of route.

As of 10 October 2010, the construction work on Dubai Tramway had progressed according to the scheduled completion of 2014. However the project was put on hold a month later due to lack of finances. The construction of the tramway was resumed in January, 2011 with 30% of Phase 1 having been completed. In mid-2014, the tramline entered the testing phase, and it began operation in November 2014.

Operations

The Dubai Tram is operated by Keolis.MHI under contract to the Dubai Roads & Transport Authority.

There are over 80 certified drivers for the tram. To ensure the safety of the tram and the passengers, every driver is required to take (and pass) an alcohol test before driving the tram. The trams also have a dead man's switch, which the drivers are required to press every three to five seconds, failing which the tram will come to a halt.

Hours of operation and frequency
The Dubai Tram operates from 06:30 until 01:00 except on Fridays when it operates from 09:00 until 01:00.

Fares
The tram has a fixed fare of AED 3 per trip regardless of the distance travelled, making it one of the cheapest fares for trams, compared to other cities. The fare for passengers using the Red Nol Ticket will be AED 4 (US$1.09) per ride.

A Nol Card can be used by passengers to check-in and check-out of the tram by scanning the card at the platform screen doors.

Rolling stock
The Dubai Tram use 11 Alstom Citadis 402 trams for Phase 1.

The trams use the Alimentation par le Sol II (APS II) ground-level power supply, and so do not need overhead cables. This method was first used in Bordeaux, France. The Dubai Tram is the world's first tram network to use platform screen doors at the stations, as well as a new Supervised Vehicle Operation (SVO) mode that will ensure accurate station stop and safety during passenger transfer. The trams have Gold (first) and silver classes, and space dedicated to women and children.

The first tram was presented to Mattar Al Tayer, Chairman of the Road & Transport Authority, at Alstom's La Rochelle factory on 14 June 2013.

Incidents and accidents

Linking with other networks 
The Dubai Tram has 2 stations that are interconnected to 2 Dubai Metro stations:
Jumeirah Lake Towers (JLT) with DMCC (Dubai Metro)
Dubai Marina with Sobha Realty (Dubai Metro)

It is also interconnected to the Palm Monorail:
Palm Jumeirah with Palm Gateway (out-of-station interchange)

See also
Downtown Dubai Tramway
Dubai Metro
List of development projects in Dubai
Nol Card

References

External links
 Roads & Transport Authority homepage
 

 
Serco
Dubai
Transport in Dubai
2014 establishments in the United Arab Emirates